Luke Koo was a Ghanaian Politician and member of the 2nd parliament of the 4th republic of Ghana representing Lambussie constituency under the membership of the National Democratic Congress (NDC).

Political career 
Luke began his political career in 1996 when he was named the political candidate to represent his constituency at the 1996 Ghanaian General Elections. He contested under the membership of NDC. He was pronounced winner after defeating Anthony Baloroo of the New Patriotic Party (NPP) and Alexander Ambreh Bayowoh of the People's National Convention (PNC). He claimed 58.50% of the total valid votes which is equivalent to 9,785 votes while his opponents (Anthony Baloroo and Alexander Ambreh Bayowoh) obtained 9.50% which is equivalent to 1,596 votes and 5.10% which is equivalent to 854 votes respectively. He died after a brief illness on 20 April 1999 therefore couldn't complete his tenure in person but his seat was left vacant. Following his death, a by-election was held on 26 May 1999 - Alice Teni Boon (NDC) won the seat with a majority of 4,488.

Personal life 
He died on 20 April 1999, he was a Christian.

References 

Ghanaian MPs 1997–2001
1999 deaths
Date of death missing
National Democratic Congress (Ghana) politicians